Hadnall railway station was a station in Hadnall, Shropshire, England. The station was opened in 1858 and closed in 1960.

References

Further reading

Disused railway stations in Shropshire
Railway stations in Great Britain opened in 1858
Railway stations in Great Britain closed in 1960
Former London and North Western Railway stations